William Foord is the name of:

William Foord-Kelcey (1854–1922), English barrister, academic and cricketer
Bill Foord (1924–2015), cricketer
William Ford (divine) (1559–?), Church of England clergyman

See also
William Ford (disambiguation)